Brachypauropodidae is a family of pauropods. Like most adult pauropods in the order Tetramerocerata, most adults in this family have 9 pairs of legs, but adults in a few species in two genera, Aletopauropus and Zygopauropus, have only 8 pairs of legs.

References

External links

Myriapod families
Myriapods